The Kingdom of Norway has submitted films in the Academy Award for Best International Feature Film category at the Oscars since 1957. They only submitted two films in their first twenty years, but they became a regular fixture in the competition in 1980, failing to submit a film only once, in 1983.

The Academy Award for Best International Feature Film is handed out annually by the United States Academy of Motion Picture Arts and Sciences to a feature-length motion picture produced outside the United States that contains primarily non-English dialogue. It was not created until the 1956 Academy Awards, in which a competitive Academy Award of Merit, known as the Best Foreign Language Film Award, was created for non-English speaking films, and has been given annually since.

, six films from Norway have been nominated for the award: Nine Lives (1957), The Pathfinder (1987), The Other Side of Sunday (1996), Elling (2001), Kon-Tiki (2012) and The Worst Person in the World (2021).

Submissions
The Academy of Motion Picture Arts and Sciences has invited the film industries of various countries to submit their best film for the Academy Award for Best Foreign Language Film since 1956. The Foreign Language Film Award Committee oversees the process and reviews all the submitted films. Following this, they vote via secret ballot to determine the five nominees for the award. Below is a list of the films that have been submitted by Norway for review by the Academy for the award by the year of the submission and the respective Academy Award ceremony.

Shortlisted Films
Each year since 2010, the Norwegian Oscar Committee has announced a three-film shortlist prior to announcing the official Norwegian Oscar candidate. The following films were shortlisted by Norway but not selected as the final candidate:

 2021: Betrayed, Ninjababy
 2020: Disco, Self-Portrait
 2019: Beware of Children, Harajuku
 2018: Blind Spot, Utøya: July 22
 2017: Hunting Flies, Tree Feller
 2016: Pyromaniac, Welcome to Norway
 2015: Homesick, Returning Home
 2014: Blind, Letter to the King
 2013: It's Only Make Believe, Pioneer
 2012: I Belong, The Orheim Company
 2011: Oslo, 31 August, Sons of Norway
 2010: Limbo, A Somewhat Gentle Man

See also
List of Academy Award winners and nominees for Best Foreign Language Film
List of Academy Award-winning foreign language films
Cinema of Norway

Notes

References

External links
The Official Academy Awards Database
The Motion Picture Credits Database
IMDb Academy Awards Page

Best Foreign Language Film Academy Award submissions by country
Submissions For The Academy Award For Best Foreign Language Film